Giovanni Muzio (12 February 1893 – 21 May 1982) was an Italian architect.  Muzio was born and died in Milan. He was closely associated with the Novecento Italiano artists group.

Biography

The son of Virginio Muzio, an accomplished architect, Muzio studied in Milan, and after participation in the war and a trip to Europe, in 1920 he opened in Milan (Via St. Ursula) a study with Giuseppe De Finetti, Gio Ponti, Emilio Lancia and Mino Fiocchi and actively participated in the cultural life of Milan.

After service in World War I Muzio began his practice in 1920 and is responsible for the  best-known work of the Novecento movement, the 1922 residential block called the Ca' Brutta ("Ugly House") on the Via Moscova in Milan.  The style is a stripped-down neo-classicism, five stories on a rounded corner patterned with real and blind arches, and bands of color for each story.

With Gio Ponti and the artist Mario Sironi, Muzio designed the Popolo d'Italia pavilion for the 1928 Milan Trade fair, the Italian pavilion for the 1928 Pressa Exhibition in Cologne and the exhibition buildings for the 1930 Triennale exhibition. Other buildings include the Milan Tennis Club (1923–1929), the Banca Bergamasca (1924–1927), and the Santa Maria Annunciata in Chiesa Rossa (1932). 

A notable project by Muzio is the design of the Basilica of the Annunciation in Nazareth, completely rebuilt between 1960 and 1969.

References

External links 
 photo of the Ca'Brutta in Milan
 Muzio Giovanni. Fascismo - Architettura - Arte / Arte fascista web site

1893 births
1982 deaths
20th-century Italian architects
Italian fascist architecture
Architects from Milan
Polytechnic University of Milan alumni